Sharafkhaneh (also Romanized as Sharafkhāneh, Sharifkhane, Sharifkhaneh, and Sheraf-Khane; also known as Bandar-e Sharafkhāneh) is a city in the Central District of Shabestar County, East Azerbaijan province, Iran. At the 2006 census, its population was 3,872 in 1,132 households. The following census in 2011 counted 3,585 people in 1,133 households. The latest census in 2016 showed a population of 4,244 people in 1,446 households. Sharafkhaneh is situated on Lake Urmia.

References 

Shabestar County

Cities in East Azerbaijan Province

Populated places in East Azerbaijan Province

Populated places in Shabestar County